James O. Manley III (born July 11, 1974 in Birmingham, Alabama) is a former American football defensive tackle in the National Football League. He played college football at Vanderbilt University. He was drafted by the Minnesota Vikings in the 2nd round of the 1996 NFL Draft. He played from 1996–1997, but did not play in a regular season game his whole career. He retired after the 1997 season.

References

1974 births
Living people
Players of American football from Birmingham, Alabama
American football defensive tackles
Vanderbilt Commodores football players
Minnesota Vikings players